Karl Henry von Wiegand (born 11 September 1874 in Hesse in Germany; died 1961) was a German born American journalist and war correspondent. The New York newspaper The Sun printed that Karl H Von Wikgand was the only American correspondent allowed to stay in Berlin during World War I.

Career
Von Wiegand worked from 1911 until 1917 for the United Press and from 1917 for Hearst Newspapers.

World War I
From the outbreak of the First World War Wiegand worked to influence American public opinion in favour of Germany and against the Allies. In 1915 he published Current misconceptions about the war, containing an interview with the German crown prince, and several essays, and a series of letters, all presenting the German point of view. 
Wiegand was the first United States reporter allowed to interview Crown prince Wilhelm. That interview was also the first foreign interview given by a German noble since the outbreak of World War I.
William E. Dodd, US ambassador to Germany during the Roosevelt administration later described him as a "very strongly pro-German representative through the Great War"

Karl von Wiegand was the father of journalist (also for Hearst's Newspapers) and abstract painter Charmion von Wiegand.

Interwar career 
He was one of the Hearst Press reporters on at least two of the Graf Zeppelin flights, usually accompanying fellow Hearst reporter Lady Hay Drummond-Hay.
Wiegand was one of the first American journalists to interview Hitler, having first met him in 1921 while he was only a minor malcontent in post-World War I Munich. He was one of the first journalists to take Hitler seriously, and his story was published on November 12, 1922, a year before the Beer Hall Putsch. As such, Wiegand provided the first introduction Americans had to Hitler. He referred to him as the "German Mussolini", and expressed genuine concern about his popularity, writing "The shadow of the Fascisti is arising in Germany. Whether what is yet only a shadow will clothe itself in the flesh, blood and spirit of the German Mussolini, depends on a number of things." He also emphasized his "man of the people" qualities, his charisma, and his electrifying speaking ability. He pegged him as a potentially great leader, saying "Hitler has the earmarks of a leader. Whether it be merely a band or a great movement, only the future will tell."

World War II and after
A month after Germany invaded France in World War II, Wiegand secured an interview with Hitler and published his report "Europe for the Europeans: Adolf Hitler on the international situation during the war in France; An interview granted to Karl v. Wiegand, Führer's Headquarters, June 11, 1940".

Later, Lady Drummond-Hay and Wiegand were interned in a Japanese camp in Manila, Philippines. When they were set free in 1943, she was very ill. They returned to the United States, but during their stay in New York Drummond-Hay died of coronary thrombosis in the Lexington Hotel. After her cremation, Karl brought her ashes back to the United Kingdom.

He died of pneumonia in Zurich in 1961 at the age of 86.

Bibliography 
Notes

References
  Doctorate dissertation
Goldstein, Benjamin S. “‘A Legend Somewhat Larger than Life’: Karl H. von Wiegand and the Trajectory of Hearstian Sensationalist Journalism*.” Historical Research 94, no. 265 (August 1, 2021): 629–59. https://doi.org/10.1093/hisres/htab019.
 
  - Total pages: 368 
 
  - Total pages: 40

External links
 Register of the Karl H. Von Wiegand Papers, 1911–1961. The Online Archive of California. (Collection open for research)
 
  Text version of letter US-ambassador  William E. Dodd sent to U.S. President Franklin D. Roosevelt on Wiegand's relationship with Germany
 

German emigrants to the United States
American male journalists
American war correspondents
1874 births
1961 deaths
Commanders Crosses of the Order of Merit of the Federal Republic of Germany
LZ 127 Graf Zeppelin